Paraproctolaelaps is a genus of mites in the family Ascidae.

Species
 Paraproctolaelaps zhongweiensis Bai & Gu, 1994

References

Ascidae